The Reckoning (also known as Crooked Streets) is a 1932 pre-Code talking film crime-drama directed by Harry L. Fraser and starring Sally Blane and James Murray. It was released on state rights and through a company called Peerless.

Preserved by the Library of Congress.

Cast
Sally Blane - Judy
James Murray - Terry
Edmund Breese - Doc
Bryant Washburn - Bob
Pat O'Malley - Ellis
Thomas E. Jackson - The Detective
Mildred Golden -
Douglas Scott -

References

External links
 The Reckoning at IMDb.com

 preserved lobby poster
The Reckoning available for free download at Internet Archive

1932 films
American crime drama films
Films directed by Harry L. Fraser
1932 crime drama films
American black-and-white films
1930s English-language films
1930s American films